Veronika Vítková (born on 9 December 1988) is a Czech former biathlete. She comes from a family of skiers and switched from cross-country to biathlon at age 10. She competed for the Czech Republic at the 2010, 2014 and 2018 Winter Olympics. At the 2014 Winter Olympics, together with Ondřej Moravec, Jaroslav Soukup and Gabriela Soukalová, she won a silver medal in the Mixed relay. At the 2018 Winter Olympics she won the bronze medal in the 7.5 km sprint event.

23/4/2020 she announced retirement and her pregnancy.

Record

Olympic Games
3 medals (1 silver, 2 bronze)''

World Championships
2 medals (1 gold, 1 bronze)

World Cup

Podiums

World Cup Relay

Podiums

World Cup Position

References

External links

International Biathlon Union – Veronika Vítková

1988 births
Living people
People from Vrchlabí
Biathletes at the 2010 Winter Olympics
Biathletes at the 2014 Winter Olympics
Biathletes at the 2018 Winter Olympics
Czech female biathletes
Olympic biathletes of the Czech Republic
Biathlon World Championships medalists
Medalists at the 2014 Winter Olympics
Medalists at the 2018 Winter Olympics
Olympic silver medalists for the Czech Republic
Olympic bronze medalists for the Czech Republic
Olympic medalists in biathlon
Sportspeople from the Hradec Králové Region